Sparaxis pillansii,  is a species of Sparaxis found in Northern Cape, South Africa.

References

External links
 
 

pillansii
Taxa named by Louisa Bolus